Georges Moreau de Tours (4 April 1848, Ivry-sur-Seine - 12 January 1901, Bois-le-Roi) was a French history painter and illustrator.

Biography 
His father was the psychiatrist Jacques-Joseph Moreau, who first suggested hemp as a treatment of mental illness. His brother, Paul Moreau de Tours, also became a psychiatrist and criminologist.

In 1865 he entered the École des Beaux-Arts, where he studied with Alexandre Cabanel. He was a regular exhibitor at the Salon from that time until 1896. In addition to his canvas paintings, he produced three scenes for the wedding chamber at the Town Hall in the Second Arrondissement.

The works he illustrated include Amy Robsart and Marie Tudor; dramas by Victor Hugo.

He was awarded the Légion d'honneur in 1892. A street in Bois-le-Roi is named after him. His wife Thérèse (a former student of his) was also a painter of some note.

Selected works

References

External links

 Bois-le-Roi website: Moreau de Tours family
 ArtNet: More works by Moreau de Tours

1848 births
1901 deaths
French history painters
19th-century French painters
French male painters
19th-century French male artists